Steve Aczel (born 8 September 1954, in Budapest) is an Australian professional light heavy/cruiser/heavyweight boxer of the 1980s, '90s and 2000s who won the Australasian light heavyweight title, Australian light heavyweight title, Australian heavyweight title, Oriental and Pacific Boxing Federation (OPBF) heavyweight title, Queensland State (Australia) heavyweight title, and Commonwealth light heavyweight title, drew with Maile Haumona for the South Pacific heavyweight title, and was a challenger for the Australian cruiserweight title against Tony Mundine, and Commonwealth cruiserweight title against Stewart Lithgo, his professional fighting weight varied from , i.e. light heavyweight to , i.e. heavyweight. He was inducted into the Australian National Boxing Hall of Fame in 2011.

Professional boxing record

References

External links

Image - Steve Aczel

1964 births
Boxers from Brisbane
Hungarian male boxers
Hungarian emigrants to Australia
Cruiserweight boxers
Light-heavyweight boxers
Living people
Sportsmen from Queensland
Australian male boxers
Commonwealth Boxing Council champions
Boxers from Budapest